Kenneth Joseph Howard Jr. (March 28, 1944 – March 23, 2016) was an American actor. He was known for his roles as Thomas Jefferson in 1776 and as basketball coach and former Chicago Bulls player Ken Reeves in the television show The White Shadow (1978–1981). Howard won the Tony Award for Best Featured Actor in a Play in 1970 for his performance in Child's Play, and later won the Primetime Emmy Award for Outstanding Supporting Actor in a Miniseries or a Movie for his work in Grey Gardens (2009).

Howard was elected president of the actors' union, Screen Actors Guild (SAG), in September 2009 and reelected to a second term, in September 2011. He was the last president of the Screen Actors Guild and the first president of the newly combined SAG-AFTRA union, after the Screen Actors Guild and another union, the American Federation of Television and Radio Artists (AFTRA), voted to merge in 2012. He was reelected in 2015.

Early life
Howard was born on March 28, 1944, in El Centro, California, the son of Martha Carey (née McDonald) and Kenneth Joseph Howard, a stockbroker, being the elder of their two sons. His younger brother, the late Don Howard, was also an actor and director. His approximately 6-foot 6-inch (1.98 m) stature earned him the nickname "Stork" as a high school student. He grew up in Manhasset, New York, on Long Island.

The nickname "The White Shadow" was given to him by the Long Island press in 1961, as, at age 17, Howard was the only white starter on the Manhasset High School varsity basketball team.

A member of the National Honor Society in high school, Howard turned down several offers of basketball scholarships in favor of a more focused academic education.  He graduated in 1966 from Amherst College, where he served as captain of the basketball team. He was also a member of the a cappella singing group The Zumbyes. He attended Yale School of Drama but left to make his Broadway debut before completing his master's degree – which he achieved in 1999.

Theater
Howard began his career on Broadway in Promises, Promises with Jerry Orbach. In 1970, he won a Tony Award as Best Supporting or Featured Actor (Dramatic) for Child's Play.  Howard later starred on Broadway as Thomas Jefferson in 1776  and reprised the role in the 1972 film. His other Broadway appearances included Seesaw in 1973 and The Norman Conquests. Howard portrayed several U.S. presidents in the 1975 Broadway musical 1600 Pennsylvania Avenue and appeared as Warren G. Harding in Camping with Henry and Tom in 1995. He appeared in legitimate theater in many cities, most recently as Tip O'Neill in a one-man show According to Tip, at the New Repertory Theatre in Watertown, Massachusetts.

Television

On television, Howard appeared as Ken Reeves, a Los Angeles high school basketball coach, in The White Shadow, produced by Bruce Paltrow in 1978. Howard had the starring role in the 1973 TV series Adam's Rib opposite his good friend (and Paltrow's wife) Blythe Danner, who also played wife Martha to his Thomas Jefferson in the film version of 1776. He starred in The Manhunter, a crime drama that was part of CBS's lineup for the 1974–75 television season.

Howard starred in the TV movie Father Damien in 1980 and won a Daytime Emmy Award in 1981 for his performance as the ideal father in the CBS afternoon special The Body Human: Facts for Boys.  Howard's additional credits included "Sidney Sheldon's Rage of Angels, 1983", the 2000 miniseries Perfect Murder, Perfect Town, and the feature film Dreamer: Inspired by a True Story, both co-starring Kris Kristofferson. He played the title character in the 1984 American Playhouse production of Mark Twain's Pudd'nhead Wilson, having earlier played Twain on Bonanza. Later, he appeared as Garrett Boydston in Dynasty and its spin-off The Colbys. In the early 1990s, he appeared on Murder, She Wrote and, from 2001–04, in Crossing Jordan as the title character's father. In 2007, he appeared in the Jimmy Smits series Cane.

Howard guest-starred on numerous television dramas. He was guest villain in Hart to Hart Returns, a 1993 made-for-TV movie. He also appeared in season one of The West Wing as President Bartlet's first choice for US Supreme Court Justice in the episode "The Short List". His other dramatic guest roles included NYPD Blue, The Practice, Boston Legal, Cold Case, Dirty Sexy Money, Eli Stone, Brothers and Sisters, Law & Order: SVU, Curb Your Enthusiasm, Fairly Legal, Crossing Jordan, The Closer, Blue Bloods, The Golden Girls, The Office, and 30 Rock.

Film

Howard made his movie debut in 1970, in Tell Me That You Love Me, Junie Moon, opposite Liza Minnelli. Numerous dramatic and comedic movie roles followed, including: Such Good Friends, 1776, The Strange Vengeance of Rosalie, Independence, Second Thoughts, Oscar with Sylvester Stallone in 1991, Ulterior Motives, Clear and Present Danger with Harrison Ford in 1994, The Net with Sandra Bullock in 1995, Tactical Assault,  Dreamer: Inspired by a True Story, and In Her Shoes in 2005.

In 2007, Howard appeared again with Stallone in Rambo, and in George Clooney's Michael Clayton. In 2010, he starred in The Numbers Game with Steven Bauer. He next appeared as Harlan F. Stone in Clint Eastwood's J. Edgar.

He gave an acclaimed performance as Phelan Beale in the 2009 HBO film Grey Gardens, playing opposite Jessica Lange, for which he received an Emmy Award. His last films were Better Living Through Chemistry (2013), A.C.O.D.(2013),  The Judge (2014), The Wedding Ringer (2015) and the biographical comedy-drama film Joy (2015).

Ken Howard was elected the National President of the Screen Actors Guild on September 24, 2009.

Author
Howard was the author of the 2003 book Act Natural: How to Speak to Any Audience, based on the drama courses he had taught at Harvard University. He was a popular reader for audiobooks.

Personal life
Howard was married three times. His first wife was actress Louise Sorel (m. 1973–75).  His second wife was writer and advice columnist Margo Howard (m. 1977–91). His final marriage was to stuntwoman Linda Fetters Howard (m. 1992–2016).

Death
The SAG-AFTRA actors' union announced Howard's death on Wednesday, March 23, 2016, five days before his 72nd birthday, although no cause was given. The Hollywood Reporter noted that Howard "was diagnosed with stage four prostate cancer in 2007 and was recently hospitalized with a case of shingles." However, Howard died of pneumonia complicated by shingles and prostate cancer in Valencia, California. He was the first and, to date, only Screen Actors Guild or SAG-AFTRA national president to die in office.

George Clooney, in whose 2007 legal thriller, Michael Clayton, Howard appeared, remembered having met him for the first time, in 1983 at 20th Century Fox, as a fan of The White Shadow.

Filmography

Film

Television

Theatre

Awards and nominations

References

External links
 
 
 
 Variety Profile

1944 births
2016 deaths
Presidents of SAG-AFTRA
American trade union leaders
American male film actors
American male stage actors
American male television actors
Presidents of the Screen Actors Guild
Amherst College alumni
Amherst Mammoths men's basketball players
Male actors from California
Male actors from New York (state)
Basketball players from California
People from Manhasset, New York
People from El Centro, California
Basketball players from New York City
Yale School of Drama alumni
Outstanding Performance by a Supporting Actor in a Miniseries or Movie Primetime Emmy Award winners
Tony Award winners
20th-century American male actors
21st-century American male actors
Activists from California
Manhasset High School alumni
American men's basketball players
Members of The Lambs Club
Deaths from pneumonia in California